Triplophysa hsutschouensis is a species of stone loach endemic to the Ruo Shui river system in Gansu, China.

References

hsutschouensis
Freshwater fish of China
Endemic fauna of Gansu
Taxa named by Carl Hialmar Rendahl
Fish described in 1933